The Letter is a 1959 concept album by American vocalist Judy Garland arranged by Gordon Jenkins.

Chronicling a relationship, the album features John Ireland.

Reception
The Allmusic review by John Bush awarded the album three stars and said "Jenkins' ambitious concept was written well and executed perfectly, and no one was better than Garland for a dramatic romantic role encompassing hope and humor...The Letter suffers, as all but the best concept albums do. Ireland is no match for Garland...and the few audio concepts on display tend toward gimmicks. In all, The Letter is a fair concept album, its interruptions annoying but its overall power raised by the twin talents of Garland and Jenkins...The original three-track stereo recording is exquisite, and upon its initial release, special copies of "the letter" were placed in envelopes and taped to the front of each record jacket".

Track listing
 "Beautiful Trouble" - 4:18
 "Love in the Village" - 4:32
 "Charley's Blues" - 3:27
 "The Worst Kind of Man" - 3:58
 "That's All There Is, There Isn't Any More" - 2:50
 "Love in Central Park" - 4:34
 "The Red Balloon" - 2:24
 "The Fight" - 3:34
 "At the Stroke of Midnight" - 4:30
 "Come Back" - 4:36
 "Beautiful Trouble [Single Version]" - 1:48
 "That's All There Is, There Isn't Any More" [Single Version] - 2:26
 "The Worst Kind of Man" [Single Version] - 2:19
 "The Red Balloon" [Single Version] - 2:03

All music and lyrics written by Gordon Jenkins.

Personnel
Judy Garland - vocals
John Ireland
Gordon Jenkins - arranger
Charles LaVere - vocals on "Charley's Blues"

References

Capitol Records albums
Albums arranged by Gordon Jenkins
Concept albums
Judy Garland albums
1959 albums